Prewitt is a surname. Notable people with the surname include:

Alan M. Prewitt (1893–1963), Chief Justice of the Tennessee Supreme Court
Archer Prewitt (born 1963), American musician and cartoonist 
Bob Prewitt (1924–2018), American college basketball coach
Cheryl Prewitt (born 1957), American Christian evangelist, author, musician and former beauty pageant titleholder
Cody Prewitt (born 1992), American football player
Hal Prewitt (born 1954), American artist, photographer, race car driver, businessman and inventor
Ken Prewitt (1946-2015), American radio news anchor
Kenneth Prewitt (born 1936), American government official

See also
Ditto-Prewitt House
Prewitt, New Mexico
Prewitt operator